The Counter-Strike match fixing scandal was a match fixing scandal involving two professional Counter-Strike: Global Offensive (CS:GO) teams, iBUYPOWER and NetCodeGuides, which resulted in the banning of 4 North American players by Valve after an expository article by esports journalist Richard Lewis. The scandal has been cited as "the first large match fixing scandal" in the CS:GO community.

Scandal
iBUYPOWER and NetCodeGuides met in an August 20, 2014 match during the CEVO Professional Season 5. iBUYPOWER (iBP) was heavily favored to win the match, but instead lost resoundingly, 16 to 4. What attracted attention at the time of the match was the strange strategies by iBuyPower: they attempted knife kills at odd times and seemed displeased that their tactics failed. Contemporary analyses blamed travel issues—the team had just played at ESL One Cologne 2014—and unfamiliarity with the map.

The next day, Dot Esports received a tip consisting of screenshots of a conversation with Shahzeb "ShahZaM" Khan before the game; in the messages, Khan said the match had been fixed and iBP was to lose. While Khan declared his own innocence, he ultimately refused to reveal who was behind the match fixing. In January 2015, the case resurfaced when a former girlfriend of an iBUYPOWER player posted a string of incriminating text messages between herself and Derek "dboorn" Boorn. In the texts, Boorn, who by this time had moved on to a new team, confirmed that the match had been fixed and that he had bet for the team using alternate accounts on the popular CS:GO Lounge site. The messages also revealed the identity of the individual who placed the bets on the team: Duc "cud" Pham, a player, skins bettor and trader. The CS:GO Lounge site, suspecting something was amiss, found that Pham had used nine accounts to place wagers that yielded a return of $1,193.14 each, for a total of $10,738.26 in gains from match fixing; it did not go public until Dot Esports provided additional evidence that linked the teams to the scandal. The revelations came at a time when iBUYPOWER's former players were shopping for a new sponsor, with Evil Geniuses being named as among the potential candidates.

Potential non-monetary motivations for match fixing included conflicts of interest between iBP players and NCG, as well as the fact that the win placed NCG one game away from qualification for the LAN finals with just two matches to play. iBP went on to win the LAN Finals, which included a victory over NetCodeGuides.

Consequences and aftermath 
As a result of the match fixing, six players and NetCodeGuides owner Casey Foster were permanently banned from all future Valve-sponsored professional tournaments. The banned players were Pham, Boorn, and iBP players Sam "DaZeD" Marine, Joshua "steel" Nissan, Braxton "swag" Pierce and Keven "AZK" Larivière. Only one former iBP member, Tyler "Skadoodle" Latham, who was the only member of the squad to not accept the skins, was not banned by Valve. Valve's official release confirmed that "a substantial number of high valued items" were transferred from accounts owned by Pham to iBP players and Foster.

DaZed and steel would turn to streaming full time after their bans were handed out. Later, Cloud9 signed Skadoodle as its new AWPer, replacing ShahZaM on the team. Skadoodle also went on to win the ELEAGUE Major: Boston 2018 and retired from competitive play on October 16, 2018. In addition, swag was signed by Cloud9 as its new analyst and streamer. AZK picked up Overwatch and was later signed by Team Liquid.

On August 1, 2017, ESL unbanned the players of iBUYPOWER, allowing them to play in all ESL Counter-Strike events except for those partnered with Valve, such as majors. DreamHack followed suit for its own events (except for Valve majors) on September 6, bringing itself in line with guidelines issued by the Esports Integrity Coalition.

On September 27, 2017, GX played its first league match in the ESEA Mountain Dew League (formerly Premier division), with ex-iBUYPOWER players swag, DaZed, and AZK, who had just left Team Liquid's Overwatch team to join his teammates, along with Matt "Pollo" Wilson and Michael "dapr" Gulino. steel joined Torqued to be on a team with his friends, including Armeen "a2z" Toussi, Trey "tck" Martin, Neil "montE" Montgomery, Sam "4sh0t" Mariano, and Carey "frozt' Kertenian. Steel was then signed on to Ghost Gaming along with Kenneth "koosta" Suen and Matt "Pollo" Wilson and was dropped alongside Ghost's entire Counter-Strike: Global Offensive roster on June 12, 2019. DaZed would later leave GX after citing a lack of motivation playing and practicing; Shawn "witmer" Taylor replaced DaZed as the in-game leader on the team.

On April 4, 2019, Braxton "swag" Pierce was signed alongside Michael "dapr" Gulino and the rest of the Swole Patrol roster under the Lazarus organisation.  Pierce was not allowed to play in the Americas Minor Closed Qualifier for the StarLadder Major, which eventually led to Lazarus' disqualification due to issues involving stand-ins Tyson "TenZ" Ngo and Pujan "FNS" Mehta.

See also 
Counter-Strike coaching bug scandal

References 

2014 in esports
2015 in esports
Match fixing
Counter-Strike competitions
Video game controversies
2014 scandals
Cheating in esports